Alexander Sergeevich Vasyunov (April 22, 1988 – September 7, 2011) was a Russian ice hockey player who played for Lokomotiv Yaroslavl in the Kontinental Hockey League. 
Alexander Vasyunov was a prospect for the New Jersey Devils in the NHL. He was drafted in the second round 58th overall in the 2006 NHL Entry Draft. Vasyunov died in the 2011 Lokomotiv Yaroslavl plane crash, along with his entire Lokomotiv team, just outside Yaroslavl, Russia. The team was on its way to Minsk, Belarus to play their 2011–12 season opener with the entire team, coaching staff, and prospects.

Playing career
Vasyunov was selected in the second round, 58th overall, of the 2006 NHL Entry Draft by the New Jersey Devils. He remained with his Russian team until the 2008–09 season, when he moved to the American Hockey League, playing in Albany, New York. In his third season in the AHL, he was called up to play for the Devils, initially for only one game in October 2010, to fill in for Ilya Kovalchuk. He returned to Albany after that game, but was called back up to join the Devils twice more during the 2010–11 season.

Vasyunov scored his first NHL goal on November 12, 2010 against Devan Dubnyk of the Edmonton Oilers. He re-joined Lokomotiv Yaroslavl on June 27, 2011, signing a one–year contract with the team.

Vasyunov was killed on September 7, 2011 in the Lokomotiv Yaroslavl plane crash. A Yakovlev Yak-42 passenger aircraft carrying nearly his entire Lokomotiv team crashed on takeoff, just outside Yaroslavl, Russia. The team was traveling to Minsk to play their opening game of the season, with its coaching staff and prospects. Lokomotiv officials said "'everyone from the main roster was on the plane plus four players from the youth team.'"

Career statistics

Regular season and playoffs

International

See also 
 List of ice hockey players who died during their playing career

References

External links

1988 births
2011 deaths
Albany Devils players
Lokomotiv Yaroslavl players
Lowell Devils players
New Jersey Devils draft picks
New Jersey Devils players
Sportspeople from Yaroslavl
Russian ice hockey left wingers
Victims of the Lokomotiv Yaroslavl plane crash